AlphaStation is the name given to a series of computer workstations, produced from 1994 onwards by Digital Equipment Corporation, and later by Compaq and HP. As the name suggests, the AlphaStations were based on the DEC Alpha 64-bit microprocessor. Supported operating systems for AlphaStations comprise Tru64 UNIX (formerly Digital UNIX), OpenVMS and Windows NT (with AlphaBIOS ARC firmware). Most of these workstations can also run various versions of Linux and BSD operating systems.

Other Alpha workstations produced by DEC include the DEC 2000 AXP (DECpc AXP 150), the DEC 3000 AXP, the Digital Personal Workstation a-Series and au-Series (codename Miata), the Multia VX40/41/42 and the Alpha XL/Alpha XLT line (a member of the Alcor Family, which had swappable daughterboard with Pentium processor, to transform to a DEC Celebris XL line).

Models 
From the XP900 onwards, all AlphaStation models were simply workstation configurations of the corresponding AlphaServer model.

Avanti Family

Alcor Family

Noritake and Rawhide Family

Tsunami Family

Titan and Marvel Family 

 A variant of the AlphaStation 1200 was also sold as the Digital Ultimate Workstation 533au².
 Some systems had one of the microprocessors deactivated, which may be reactivated with a license upgrade.

References

External links
 HP AlphaStation range
 Compaq Alpha System and Model Code Names (at archive.org)
 FreeBSD/alpha 6.1 Hardware Notes
 About NetBSD/alpha
 The OpenBSD/alpha port
 Debian Alpha system types

See also 
 AlphaVM: A full DEC Alpha system emulator running on Windows or Linux. 

64-bit computers
DEC workstations
Advanced RISC Computing
Computer-related introductions in 1994
Compaq Alpha-based computers